Sainte-Apolline-de-Patton is a parish municipality of 542 people in Montmagny Regional County Municipality in the Chaudière-Appalaches region of Quebec.

Demographics 

See also
L'Islet Regional County Municipality
Big Black River (Saint John River), a river
List of parish municipalities in Quebec

References

Parish municipalities in Quebec
Incorporated places in Chaudière-Appalaches